Crescitelli is an Italian surname. Notable people with the surname include:

Alberic Crescitelli (1863–1900), Italian Roman Catholic priest and missionary
Tony Crescitelli (born 1957), Italian-American footballer

Italian-language surnames